Alana Barber (born 8 July 1987) is a New Zealand race walker who won a silver medal in the 20 km race walk at the 2018 Commonwealth Games.

Early life and family
Barber was born in Auckland on 8 July 1987, the daughter of Shirley Somervell, who represented New Zealand at the 1974 British Commonwealth Games finishing seventh in the final of the 800 m. Barber was educated at Diocesan School for Girls, Auckland.

Athletics
Barber competed in the 20 kilometres race walk at the 2015 World Championships in Athletics, finishing 18th and setting a New Zealand record of 1:33:20. The following year, at the Rio 2016 Summer Olympics, she recorded a time of 1:35:55 in finishing 35th in the same event.

Her inaugural New Zealand national title came in the 20 km race walk in Hamilton in 2018.

In the 20 km walk at the 2018 Commonwealth Games on the Gold Coast, Barber won the silver medal, finishing in a time of 1:34:18, 1:28 behind the winner, Jemima Montag of Australia.

Barber announced her retirement on 17 September 2021.

References

External links
 
 

1987 births
Living people
Athletes from Auckland
People educated at Diocesan School for Girls, Auckland
New Zealand female racewalkers
World Athletics Championships athletes for New Zealand
Olympic athletes of New Zealand
Athletes (track and field) at the 2016 Summer Olympics
Athletes (track and field) at the 2018 Commonwealth Games
Commonwealth Games silver medallists for New Zealand
Commonwealth Games medallists in athletics
Medallists at the 2018 Commonwealth Games